Walter Weaver may refer to:

 Walter L. Weaver (1851–1909), U.S. Representative from Ohio
 Walter Weaver (footballer) (1898–1965), English footballer
 Walter Reed Weaver (1885–1944), U.S. Army general

See also
 Walther Wever (disambiguation)